Edith Sheriff MacGregor Rome RRC SRN (died 6 June 1938) was a British nursing matron and administrator. She served as President of the Royal College of Nursing (RCN) from 1933–34 and again from 1937–38.

Biography
Edith Sheriff MacGregor was born in Scotland in 1870. She was trained at Westminster Hospital and later served as Assistant Matron of the Warneford Hospital, Leamington and as Matron of the Paddington Green Children's Hospital. During World War 1 she led a nursing unit of the British Red Cross Society into Romania in 1916 and then onwards in 1918 to Russia and Serbia with Lady Muriel Paget's unit. She was later the first Secretary of the Student Nurses' Association until leaving to get married in 1930. She was Matron-in-Chief of the British Red Cross Society before going on to serve two terms as President of the RCN.

Honours
She served with distinction during World War I. She was awarded the:
 Royal Red Cross, 1st Class (UK)
 Order of Regina Maria, 1st Class (Rumania)
 Order of Saint Anna (Russia).

Death
Rome died on 6 June 1938. Her funeral was held at the Southampton Crematorium on 13 June 1938 and a memorial service was held in the chapel.

References

Year of birth unknown
1938 deaths
Nurses from London
British nursing administrators
Members of the Royal Red Cross
Place of birth missing
Date of birth unknown
Presidents of the Royal College of Nursing